The 2014 United States House of Representatives elections in Virginia were held on Tuesday, November 4, 2014, to elect the 11 members from the state of Virginia to the United States House of Representatives, one from each of the state's 11 congressional districts. On the same day, elections took place for other federal and state offices, including an election to the United States Senate. Primary elections, in which party nominees were chosen, were held on June 10, 2014. 

On June 10, 2014, Republican Eric Cantor became the first sitting House majority leader to lose in a primary election since the position was created in 1899. This is the last time Republicans won the House popular vote in Virginia.

Overview

By district
Results of the 2014 United States House of Representatives elections in Virginia by district:

District 1

Republican Rob Wittman had represented Virginia's 1st congressional district since 2007 and ran for re-election.

Republican primary

Candidates

Nominee
Rob Wittman, incumbent U.S. Representative

Eliminated in primary
Anthony Riedel, public relations specialist for National Right to Work Legal Defense Foundation.

Results

Democratic primary

Candidates

Nominee
 Norm Mosher, former navy officer and U.S. Senate staffer

Minor candidates
 Gail Parker (Independent), retired U.S. Air Force officer and perennial candidate
 Chris Hailey (write-in), government teacher at Lafayette High School

Withdrew
 Xavian Draper (Libertarian) did not achieve ballot access.

General election

Endorsements

Results

External links
 Rob Wittman campaign website
 Norm Mosher campaign website
 Gail Parker campaign website

District 2

Republican Scott Rigell represented Virginia's 2nd congressional district since 2011. He won re-election to a second term in 2012 against Democratic businessman Paul Hirschbiel with 54% of the vote. Rigell ran for re-election.

Republican primary

Candidates

Nominee
 Scott Rigell, incumbent U.S. Representative

Democratic primary

Candidates

Nominee
 Suzanne Patrick, retired Navy Commander

Minor parties

Withdrew
 Allen Knapp (Libertarian) is not listed on the ballot.
 John Smith (Independent Green) is not listed on the ballot.

General election

Endorsements

Results

External links
 Scott Rigell campaign website
 Suzanne Patrick campaign website

District 3

Democrat Bobby Scott has represented Virginia's 3rd congressional district since 1993. He won re-election to an eleventh term in 2012 against Republican businessman Dean Longo, with 81% of the vote. Scott ran for re-election unopposed.

Democratic primary

Candidates

Nominee
 Bobby Scott, incumbent U.S. Representative

Minor parties
 Justin Gandino-Saadein (Independent) is not listed on the ballot.
 Justin Upshaw (Libertarian) is not listed on the ballot.

General election

Endorsements

Results

External Links
 Bobby Scott campaign website

District 4

Republican Randy Forbes has represented Virginia's 4th congressional district since 2001. He won re-election in 2012 against Democratic Chesapeake City Councilwoman Ella Ward, with 57% of the vote. Forbes ran for re-election.

Republican primary

Candidates

Nominee
 Randy Forbes, incumbent U.S. Representative

Democratic primary

Candidates

Nominee
 Elliott Fausz, publishing manager

Minor parties
 Bo Brown (Libertarian), accounting professional

Withdrew
 Albert Burckardt (Independent Green) is not listed on the ballot.

General election

Endorsements

Results

External links
 Randy Forbes campaign website 
 Elliott Fausz campaign website
 Bo Brown campaign website

District 5

Republican Robert Hurt has represented Virginia's 5th congressional district since 2011.  He won re-election to a second term in 2012 against Democrat John W. Douglass, with 55% of the vote. Hurt ran for re-election.

Republican primary

Candidates

Nominee
 Robert Hurt, incumbent U.S. Representative

Democratic convention

Candidates

Nominee
 Lawrence Gaughan, actor and political activist

Eliminated at the convention
 Ben Hudson, teacher and retired U.S. Army Lieutenant Colonel

Results
Hudson challenged Gaughan at the Democratic convention on May 31, 2014. Gaughan won the nomination.

Minor parties
 Kenneth Hildebrandt (Independent Green), former chiropractic physician
 Paul Jones (Libertarian), entrepreneur and owner of The Belvedere Company

General election

Endorsements

Results

External links
 Robert Hurt campaign website
 Lawrence Gaughan campaign website
 Paul Jones campaign page
 Kenneth Hildebrandt campaign website

District 6

Republican Bob Goodlatte has represented Virginia's 6th congressional district since 1993. He won his eleventh term to Congress over Democrat Andy Schmookler with 65% of the vote in 2012. Goodlatte is running for re-election.

Republican primary

Candidates

Nominee
 Bob Goodlatte, incumbent U.S. Representative

Democratic primary
Bruce Elder, a Staunton City Councilman, the only Democrat to file, had to end his campaign after being diagnosed with cancer. As a result Democrats did not field any candidate to challenge Goodlatte.

Candidates

Withdrawn
Bruce Elder, Staunton City Councilman

Minor parties
 Will Hammer (Libertarian)
 Elaine Hildebrandt (Independent Green)

General election

Endorsements

Results

External links
 Bob Goodlatte campaign website
 Will Hammer campaign website

District 7

Eric Cantor, the U.S. House Majority Leader, has represented the 7th District since 2001. Cantor won re-election to a seventh term in 2012 against Democrat Wayne Powell with 58% of the vote.

Republican primary
On June 10, 2014, Cantor lost the nomination of the Republican Party to college professor Dave Brat. This was the first time a sitting House Majority Leader lost in a primary election since the position was created in 1899.

Candidates

Nominee
 Dave Brat, Randolph–Macon College professor and economist

Eliminated in primary
 Eric Cantor, incumbent U.S. representative and House Majority Leader

Withdrawn
 Pete Greenwald, Senior Naval Science Instructor at Chesterfield County Public Schools

Polling

Results

Democratic primary

Candidates

Nominee
 Jack Trammell, Randolph-Macon College professor

Minor parties
 James Carr (Libertarian), financial analyst

Withdrew
 Tareq Salahi (Independent Green), television personality and write-in candidate for governor in 2013 (declared as a Republican, then switched parties) Originally, Joe Oddo, the state chairman for the Independent Greens, was listed as the 7th district's candidate. However, Salahi failed to file the required 1,000 signatures to get on the ballot.

Special election

A special election was held on the same date as the general election as Cantor resigned from Congress on August 18, 2014, after his surprising loss to Brat.

Results

General election

Endorsements

Results

External links
 Dave Brat campaign website
 Jack Trammell campaign website
 James Carr campaign website

District 8

Democrat Jim Moran, who has represented Virginia's 8th congressional district since 1991, was re-elected in 2012 over Republican Jay Patrick Murray with 65% of the vote. On January 15, 2014, Moran announced that he would retire from Congress, rather than run for re-election.

Democratic primary

Candidates

Nominee
 Don Beyer, former lieutenant governor of Virginia, nominee for governor in 1997 and former United States Ambassador to Switzerland and Liechtenstein

Eliminated in primary
 Lavern Chatman, former president and CEO of the Northern Virginia Urban League
 Adam Ebbin, state senator
 William Euille, Mayor of Alexandria
 Patrick Hope, state delegate
 Derek Hyra, college professor and Alexandria Planning Commission member
 Mark Levine, talk radio host and former chief legislative counsel to Congressman Barney Frank

Withdrawn
 Charniele Herring, state delegate and former chair of the Democratic Party of Virginia
 Satish Korpe, businessman
 Alfonso H. Lopez, state delegate
 Nancy Najarian, business development consultant
 Bruce Shuttleworth, businessman and candidate for the seat in 2012
 Mark Sickles, state delegate

Declined
 Bob Brink, state delegate
 Aneesh Chopra, former Chief Technology Officer of the United States and candidate for lieutenant governor in 2013
 Kerry J. Donley, former mayor of Alexandria
 Barbara Favola, state senator
 Paul Ferguson, Arlington County Clerk of the Court
 Jay Fisette, chair of the Arlington County Board of Supervisors
 Libby Garvey, Arlington County Supervisor
 Rob Krupicka, state delegate
 Ryan McElveen, member of the Fairfax County School Board
 Jeff McKay, Fairfax County Supervisor
 Brian Moran, Secretary of Public Safety of Virginia, former state delegate and candidate for governor in 2009
 Karyn Moran
 Jim Moran, incumbent U.S. representative
 Tom Perriello, former U.S. representative and president and CEO of the Center for American Progress Action Fund
 Scott Surovell, state delegate
 Walter Tejada, Arlington County Supervisor

Endorsements

Polling

Results

Republican convention

Candidates
 Dennis Bartow, wine importer and former congressional aide
 Micah Edmond, aerospace industry lobbyist and former congressional aide
 Paul Haring, former Texas State Representative and candidate for Texas's 34th congressional district in 2012

Endorsements

Results
Micah Edmond won the nomination for the seat at the 8th District Republican Convention on April 26, 2014, with 51% of the vote.

Minor parties
 Jeffrey Carson (Libertarian), U.S. Army veteran
 Gerard Blais (Independent Green)
 Gwendolyn Beck (Independent)

General election

Endorsements

Results

External links
 Micah Edmond campaign website
 Don Beyer campaign website
 Jeffrey Carson campaign website
 Gerard Blais campaign website
 Gwendolyn Beck campaign website

District 9

Republican Morgan Griffith has represented Virginia's 9th congressional district since 2011. He won re-election to a second term in 2012 against Democrat Anthony Flaccavento with 61% of the vote. Griffith ran for re-election.

Republican primary

Candidates

Nominee
 Morgan Griffith, incumbent U.S. Representative

Minor parties
 William Carr (Independent), businessman

Withdrew
 Matthew Edwards (Libertarian) is not listed on the ballot.

General election

Results

Endorsements

Results

External links
 Morgan Griffith campaign website
 William Carr campaign website

District 10

Republican Frank Wolf has served 17 terms in the House of Representatives, he announced in January, 2014 that he will not seek re-election in 2014.

Republican primary
Six candidates filed to run for the Republican nomination. There were two debates for the Republican candidates, held on March 15 and April 9.

Candidates

Nominee
 Barbara Comstock, state delegate

Eliminated in primary
 Stephen Hollingshead, former United States Department of Housing and Urban Development adviser and nominee for WI-05 in 1994
 Howie Lind, former chairman of the 10th Congressional District Republican Committee and former candidate for the U.S. Senate
 Bob Marshall, state delegate
 Marc Savitt, president of the National Association of Independent Housing Professionals
 Rob Wasinger, former chief of staff to Congressman Kerry Bentivolio and candidate for KS-01 in 2010

Withdrawn
 Brent Anderson, retired US Air Force officer
 Dick Black, state senator
 Luellen Hoffman, director of exhibits at the National Defense Industrial Association
 Tareq Salahi, television personality and write-in candidate for governor in 2013

Declined
 Carol Brauninger
 Beau Correll, attorney and chairman of the Winchester Republican Committee
 Ken Cuccinelli, Attorney General of Virginia and nominee for governor in 2013
 Artur Davis, former Democratic U.S. Representative from Alabama
 Michael Farris, founder of Patrick Henry College, the Home School Legal Defense Association and nominee for lieutenant governor in 1993
 Keith Fimian, businessman and Republican nominee for the 11th District in 2008 and 2010
 Bill Fox, Loudoun County School Board member
 Pat Herrity, Fairfax County Supervisor
 Tim Hugo, state delegate
 Jim LeMunyon, state delegate
 Randy Minchew, state delegate
 David Ramadan, state delegate
 Richard Shickle, chairman of the Frederick County Board of Supervisors
 Corey Stewart, chairman of the Prince William Board of County Supervisors
 John Stirrup, former Prince William County Supervisor
 Jill Holtzman Vogel, state senator
 Suzanne Volpe, Loudoun County Supervisor
 Scott York,  chairman of the Loudoun County Board of Supervisors

Endorsements

Polling

Results
Over 13,000 votes were cast in the firehouse primary held on April 26. Comstock won with 53.9% of the vote. Marshall was second with 28.1%, followed by Lind (8.1%), Hollingshead (5.9%), Wasinger (2.2%), and Savitt (1.6%).

Democratic primary

Candidates

Nominee
 John Foust, Fairfax County Supervisor

Withdrawn
 Richard Bolger, attorney
 Sam Kubba, architect

Declined
 Karen Kennedy Schultz, Shenandoah University professor and state senate candidate in 2007

Endorsements

Results
John Foust was the only candidate to file for the Democratic nomination; as such, he was certified as the nominee by the Democratic Party in March 2014.

Minor parties
 Bill Redpath (Libertarian), chairman of the Libertarian Party of Virginia
 Dianne Blais (Independent Green), businesswoman
 Brad Eickholt (Independent), former government employee

Withdrew
 Francis "Frank" Pilliere (Independent) is not listed on the ballot.
 James Rouse (Independent) is not listed on the ballot.

General election

Endorsements

Polling

Predictions

Results

External links
 Barbara Comstock campaign website
 John Foust campaign website
 Bill Redpath campaign website
 Dianne Blais campaign website
 Brad Eickholt campaign website

District 11

Democrat Gerry Connolly, who has represented Virginia's 11th congressional district since 2009, was re-elected in 2012 against Republican Christopher Perkins with 61% of the vote. Connolly is seeking re-election to a fourth term in 2014.

Democratic primary

Candidates

Nominee
 Gerry Connolly, incumbent U.S. Representative

Republican primary

Candidates

Nominee
 Suzanne Scholte, human rights activist

Minor parties
 Joseph "Joe" Galdo (Green Party), former United States Department of Energy employee
 Marc Harrold (Libertarian), attorney, author, television analyst and former law-enforcement officer
 Joseph Plummer (write-in), founder of The Three Birds Foundation

Withdrew
 Mark Gibson (Independent) is not listed on the ballot.

General election

Endorsements

Results

External links
 Gerry Connolly campaign website
 Suzanne Scholte campaign website
 Marc Harrold campaign website
 Joe Galdo campaign website

See also
 2014 United States House of Representatives elections
 2014 United States elections
 Republican Party of Virginia
 Democratic Party of Virginia
 Libertarian Party of Virginia
 Independent Greens of Virginia
 Green Party of Virginia

References

External links
U.S. House elections in Virginia, 2014 at Ballotpedia
Campaign contributions at OpenSecrets

Virginia
2014
United States House of Representatives